Shaun Gill (born 9 April 1993) is a Belizean athlete. He competed in the men's 60 metres at the 2018 IAAF World Indoor Championships. He competed in the preliminary rounds at the 2020 Olympic Games 100 metres in Tokyo running 10.88 seconds.

References

External links
 

1993 births
Living people
Belizean male sprinters
Athletes (track and field) at the 2018 Commonwealth Games
Commonwealth Games competitors for Belize
Place of birth missing (living people)
Central American Games silver medalists for Belize
Central American Games medalists in athletics
Athletes (track and field) at the 2020 Summer Olympics
Olympic athletes of Belize
Olympic male sprinters
People from Belize City
Athletes (track and field) at the 2022 Commonwealth Games